Roddy Darragon (born August 31, 1983 in Le Grand-Bornand) is a French cross-country skier and non-commissioned officer who has competed since 2002. Competing in three Winter Olympics, he earned France's first ever Winter Olympic cross-country skiing medal with a silver in the individual sprint event at Turin in 2006.

Darragon's best finish at the FIS Nordic World Ski Championships was a 35th in the individual sprint event in 2005. His best World Cup finish was fourth in a sprint event in the Czech Republic in 2005.

Cross-country skiing results
All results are sourced from the International Ski Federation (FIS).

Olympic Games
 1 medal – (1 silver)

World Championships

World Cup

Season standings

Individual podiums
1 podium – (1 )

References

External links
 
 
 

1983 births
Cross-country skiers at the 2002 Winter Olympics
Cross-country skiers at the 2006 Winter Olympics
Cross-country skiers at the 2010 Winter Olympics
French male cross-country skiers
Living people
Olympic cross-country skiers of France
Olympic silver medalists for France
Olympic medalists in cross-country skiing
Sportspeople from Haute-Savoie
Medalists at the 2006 Winter Olympics
Université Savoie-Mont Blanc alumni